Talavera de la Reina railway station is a railway station serving the Spanish city of Talavera de la Reina, in the province of Toledo.

History and description 
The station was inaugurated on 13 July 1876, as the 48.76 km Torrijos–Talavera stretch of the Madrid–Extremadura line was opened on that day. Soon later, on 2 September 1877, the 35.0 km stretch from Talavera to Oropesa was opened. The façade of the building displays ornamental tiles.

It lies at the kilometre 134.2 of the conventional gauge railway line linking Madrid to Valencia de Alcántara.

It also operates  and  services. As of January 2020, the station features an average of 106 users per day.

References 
Citations

Bibliography
 

Buildings and structures in Talavera de la Reina
Railway stations in Castilla–La Mancha
Railway stations in Spain opened in 1876